The women's singles tournament in tennis at the 2007 Pan American Games was held at Marapendi Club in Rio de Janeiro from July 18 to July 22.

Medalists

Draw

Finals

Top half

Bottom half

Women's singles